The 1994–95 Eredivisie season was the 35th season of the Eredivisie, the top level of ice hockey in the Netherlands. Seven teams participated in the league, and the Tilburg Trappers won the championship.

Regular season

Playoffs

External links 
 Season on hockeyarchives.info

Neth
Eredivisie (ice hockey) seasons
Ere 
Ere